The 2013 season was Minnesota United FC's fourth season of existence and their third consecutive season playing in the North American Soccer League, the second division of the American soccer pyramid.

Background

Roster

Staff

Transfers

In

Out

Loans in

Friendlies

Competitions

NASL Spring season

Standings

Results summary

Results

NASL Fall season

Standings

Results summary

Results

U.S. Open Cup

Squad statistics

Appearances and goals

|-
|colspan="14"|Players who left Minnesota United during the season:

|-
|}

Goal scorers

Disciplinary record

References

Minnesota United FC seasons
Minnesota United Football Club
Minnesota United Football Club
Minnesota United